The 2004–05 Asia League Ice Hockey season was the second season of Asia League Ice Hockey. Eight teams participated in the league, and Kokudo Ice Hockey Club won the championship.

Regular season

Playoffs

External links
 Asia League Ice Hockey

Asia League Ice Hockey
Asia League Ice Hockey seasons
Asia
Asia